Scouting and Guiding in Ontario has a long history. Although there is some dispute about the founding of the first Scouting Group, both 1st Merrickville and 1st St. Catharines Scout Group have a documented existence from 1908. In 1955, the 8th World Scout Jamboree was held at Niagara-on-the-Lake, Ontario. Scouting continues in Ontario to the present day, serving thousands of youths in programs that suit the environment in which they live.

Scouting organizations in Ontario 

There are several Scouting organizations operating in Ontario. The largest of these is Scouts Canada, which had a combined youth and adult membership as of August 2007 of 99,573, down from 265,313 in 1990. While most Scouts Canada groups operate in English, some operate in French, and French language handbooks and resource material are available. Scouting in the French language is also provided under the auspices of L'Association des Scouts du Canada (sometimes referred to as Les Scouts). These groups are situated mostly in the eastern and north eastern parts of the province which have a higher concentration of francophone residents. Together, Scouts Canada and the Association des Scouts du Canada are members of the World Organization of the Scout Movement (WOSM).

Ontario has several organizations which are not part of WOSM. In some cases, they were created because members felt that Scouts Canada had drifted too far from the program originally developed by Scouting's founder, Baden Powell. Some trace their roots to the Baden-Powell Scouts' Association in the United Kingdom:

 BPSA Ontario, which is part of BPSA in Canada.
 Canadian Traditional Scouting Association
 The Federation of North-American Explorers (FNE) are members of the Catholic International Union of Guides and Scouts of Europe and has groups in Thornhill, Toronto, and Ottawa.

There are at least three ethnic or culturally based Scouting associations which operate in Ontario:
 ZHR Polish Scouts of Canada (Związek Harcerstwa Rzeczypospolitej w Kanadzie) was founded in 1996 and has units in the Greater Toronto Area and Peterborough, Ontario and is not affiliated to Związek Harcerstwa Rzeczypospolitej in Poland.
 Polish Scouting Association in Canada Incorporated (Związek Harcerstwa Polskiego Poza Granicami Kraju), a Polish émigré organization, also not connected to Związek Harcerstwa Polskiego in Poland.
 Plast, a Ukrainian émigré organization. Plast is also the name of the National Scout Organization of the Ukraine.

Scouts Canada

History of Provincial Council for Ontario 
On December 21, 1910 his Excellency Earl Grey, Governor General of Canada and Chief Scout for Canada, together with His Honour J.M. Gibson, Lieutenant Governor of Ontario, Dr. K.A. Pyne, Ontario Minister of Education, and a number of prominent citizens from all parts of the province, met in Toronto to select gentlemen who are interested and who would assist in the Boy Scout Movement and form a Council for Ontario.

For many years Scouts Canada scouting in Ontario was led by this Provincial Council for Ontario, under which operated numerous regional councils the exact number and geography of which changed over the years. However, in 2002 when Scouts Canada reorganized, the provincial council ceased to exist and the eight councils remaining in Ontario reported directly to the national council. An incorporated body still exists for the purpose of holding ownership of property as required by provincial laws.

Presidents of the Provincial Council for Ontario 
 1910–1913 W.K. George
 1913–1920 Lt. Col. A.E. Gooderham
 1920–1922 G.E. Fauquier
 1922–1936 J.W. Mitchell
 1936–1938 P.G. Cherry
 1938–1939 Col. Sir G.McL. Brown
 1939–1945 W.J. Cairns
 1945–1951 A.H. Richardson
 1951–1957 J.B. Ridley
 1957–1959 W.H.J. Tisdale
 1959–1961 I.D. MacArthur
 1961–1962 A.R. Aylsworth
 1963–1964 J.B. Ridley
 1964–1965 W.R. Kay, F.C.A.
 1966–1967 E.A Jarrett
 1968–1969 K.R. Van Wyck
 1970–1971 J.K McKay
 1972–1974 Stanley Lovell
 1974–1975 Judge Charles O. Bick
 1975–1977 Dr. B.M. Jackson
 1977-1978 W.B. Tilden
 1978-1979 F.L Greaves
 1979-1981 R.A. Norman
 1981-1983 W.A. Baker
 1983-1985 T.D. Philp
 1985-1987 M.W. Townsend
 1987-1990 H.R. Finley
 1990-1993 L.R.L. Symmes
 1993-1995 J.S. Cowan
 1995-1998 D.W. Hamilten
 1998-2000 R. Dychuck
 2000-2002 Kathryn Brown (1st female Ontario Council President)

Provincial Commissioners 
 1910-1913 Capt R.S. Wilson
 1913-1922 W.K. George
 1922-1924 J.F.M. Stewart
 1924-1934 H.A. Laurence
 1934-1938 W.J. Cairns
 1938-1941 Lt. Col. R.P. Locke
 1941-1948 Lt. Col. L.H. Millen
 1948-1957 W.H.J. Tisdale
 1957-1964 F.A. Worth
 1965-1966 R.A. Phillips
 1966-1969 A.W. Denny
 1969-1972 Rev. Prof. Dr. R.J. Williams
 1972-1976 C.J. Clark
 1976-1978 F.L. Greaves
 1978-1980 D.M. Deacon
 1980-1983 F.A. Whiskin
 1983-1986 E.R. McCrimmon
 1986-1989 H. Coulson, C.D.
 1989-1992 K.H Robertson
 1992-1994 Rev. P. Jackson
 1994-1997 J.A. Evans (1st female Ontario Provincial Commissioner)
 1997-1999 T. Godfrey
 1999-2002 C. Lawrence

Provincial Executive Directors 
(Previously known as Provincial Scout Executive or Provincial Executive Commissioner or Executive Secretary. In early years it also carried the title of Assistant Provincial Commissioner.)
 1910–1920 Capt. H.G. Hammond
 1920–1954 Frank C. Irwin
 1955–1969 Reginald St.J. Terrett
 1969–1989 Joseph E. Turner
 1989–1995 Frank C. Spence
 1996–2002 Barry M. Hardaker
Col. Rufus Spooner of The Salvation Army acted as Provincial Executive Commissioner following Frank Irwin's sudden death until the appointment of Reg Terrett.

Scouts Canada and WOSM Jamborees held in Ontario 
 1949: 1st Canadian Scout Jamboree, Connaught Ranges, Ottawa, Ontario. 2,579 attend.
 1953: 2nd Canadian Scout Jamboree, Connaught Ranges, Ottawa, Ontario. 1,196 attend.
 1955: 8th World Scout Jamboree Niagara-on-the-Lake, Ontario
 1961: 3rd Canadian Scout Jamboree, Connaught Ranges, Ottawa, Ontario. 2,095 attend.
 1985: 6th Canadian Scout Jamboree, Guelph Lake Conservation Area, Guelph, Ontario. 12,000 attend.
 1997: 9th Canadian Scout Jamboree, Boulevard Lake Park, Thunder Bay, Ontario. 13,879 attend.

Scouts Canada councils in Ontario 
Ontario is administered in Scouts Canada by 8 Councils divided into Service Areas.

 Battlefields Council
 Brant Area
 Fruitbelt
 Haldimand
 Hamilton-Wentworth Area
 Lynn Valley
 Merritt Trail
 Niagara Area
 South Waterloo Area
 St. Catharines Area
 Central Escarpment Council
 Brampton Area (merged with Greater Halton Area to form Credit Hills Area in 2010)
 Burlington Area
 Credit Hills Area
 Greater Halton Area (merged with Brampton Area to form Credit Hills Area in 2010)
 Mississauga Area
 North Waterloo Area
 Oakville Area
 Wellington Area
 Yellow Briar Area
 Greater Toronto Council
 Alders Area
 Agincourt Area
 Humber West Area
 Old Mill Area
68th Toronto Scout Group
 Scarborough Area
 Seton Area
 Skyline Area
 Sunnybrook Area
 Willow Valley Area
 Northern Ontario Council
 Nipissing Area
 Sault Ste. Marie Area
 Sudbury Area
 Thunder Bay Area
 Black River Area
 Points North Area
 Ken Kee Area
 Sunset Area
 Shining Waters Council
 Northern Lights Area
 Simcoe Phoenix Area
 14th Barrie 
 South Lake Simcoe Area
 Sunset Area
 Wendake Shores Area (Merged with Whispering Pines in 2013.)
 Whispering Pines Area
 York Headwaters Area
 Tri-Shores Council
 Elgin Area
 London Area
 Sydenham Area
 Windsor Area
 Essex Area
 Chatham/Kent Area
 Bluewater Area
 Frontier Area
 Mindaamin Area
 Voyageur Council
 Heritage Area
 Loyalist Area (Kingston/Frontenac)
 Nunavut
 Nepean Area
 Valley Highlands Area
 Rideau Area
 Upper St. Lawrence Valley Area
 Algonquin Hills Area
 Odawa Area
 Carleton Area
 White Pine Council
 Oshawa Area
 Algonquinte Area
 Kawartha Waterways Area
 Owasco Area
 Trillium Highlands Area
 Whitby Area
 Lakeshore Ridge Area

Scouts Canada Council camp sites 
Because much of scouting's programs are focused on the outdoors, a large number of properties have been donated or purchased and developed as scouting campgrounds over the years. Driven by declining membership, increasing costs, and liability issues, Scouts Canada conducted a property review in Ontario which concluded that dozens of camps should be sold. This has resulted in legal action between the Scouts Canada Ontario Incorporated Body and local Scouters. Action was underway in November 2005 and is ongoing. Scouts Canada's camps in Ontario are generally administered by one of the four Administrative Centres. The following list is as of May 14, 2007:

Central Ontario 

 Blue Springs Scout Reserve (near Acton, Ontario)
 Camp Char'Bro (near Owen Sound, Ontario)
 Camp Everton (near Rockwood, Ontario)
 Goodyear Memorial Scout Camp (near Orangeville, Ontario)
 Green Bay Scout Camp (Lake Cecebe, Ontario on the Magnetawan River system)
 Haliburton Scout Reserve (near Haliburton, Ontario)
 Camp Manitou (near Campbellville, Ontario)
 Camp Wildman Scout Camp (near Midland, Ontario)
 Woodland Trails Scout Camp (near Stouffville, Ontario)

Eastern Ontario 

 Camp Apple Hill (in Odawa Area)
 Camp Opemikon (near Perth, Ontario)
 Otter Lake (Otter Lake, Quebec)
 Otter Lake, Ontario (beside Frontenac Provincial Park)
 Camp Legewade (near Renfrew, Ontario)
 Camp Folly (southeast shore of Newboro Lake)
 Camp Oskenonton (on Buck Lake)
 Camp Samac (in Oshawa, Ontario)
 Camp Sheldrick (near Winchester, Ontario)

Southwestern Ontario 

 Camp Attawandaron (near Grand Bend, Ontario and bordering Pinery Provincial Park)
 Barber Memorial Scout Camp (in Guelph, Ontario adjacent to the Eramosa River)
 Camp BEL (in Dorchester, Ontario east of London, Ontario)
 The Bryson Centre (in the north end of London, Ontario)
 Camp Cataraqui (east of Chatham, Ontario)
 Camp Cedarwin (near Kingsville, Ontario)
 Camp Impeesa (near Brantford, Ontario)
 Camp Mohawk (in Kitchener, Ontario)
 Camp Manitou (in Milton, Ontario)
 Mount Nemo Camp (near Burlington, Ontario)
 Ragged Falls (near Dwight, Ontario)
 Camp Shegardaynou (near Woodstock, Ontario)
 Camp Sylvan (north of London, Ontario)
 Camp Timkin (near St Thomas, Ontario)
 Camp Wadiscoca (near Wallaceburg, Ontario)
 Camp Wetaskiwin (near St. Catharines, Ontario)

Northern Ontario 
 Camp Bimoba (on Scout Island - Middle Lake, Kenora, Ontario)
 Grey Wolf (Thunder Bay, Ontario)
 Wilabosca (Sudbury, Ontario)

Other facilities and province-wide events 

 Belleville District Scout-Guide Museum
 Scout Brigade of Fort George , Niagara-on-the-Lake
 Gilwell Reunion

129th Toronto Scouting Group 
The 129th Toronto Scouting Group (also known as the Queer Toronto Scouting Group) was believed to be the first group worldwide exclusively for gay, lesbian, and bisexual youths and adults. The group was founded by gay activist Bonte Minnema and chartered by Scouts Canada in 1999. Consistent with Scouts Canada policy, the group was co-ed. It made world headlines, including the BBC World News, when a story by Reuters first brought attention to the group's existence.

In October 1999, American Pastor Fred Phelps and his congregation at the Westboro Baptist Church planned to protest outside the Ontario offices of Scouts Canada. However, Canada Customs denied them entry into the country. This prevented Phelps and his church members from appearing, and left supporters of the group to rally outside the offices without opposition.

The group folded in 2001 due to a lack of interest.

Girl Guiding in Ontario 

Mary Malcolmson organized the first Canadian Girl Guide Company to be officially registered in St. Catharines, Ontario; their registration is dated January, 1910. A park in St. Catharines was later named for Mary Malcolmson. Other Guide Companies were registered later in 1910, in Toronto. The First Toronto Company held the first-recorded Girl Guide Camp in Canada on the banks of the Credit River in June, 1911. By 1912, the movement had spread to all parts of Canada, and had become so popular that on July 24, 1912 Agnes Baden-Powell created Lady Mary Pellatt "Chief Commissioner of the Dominion of Canada Girl Guides". Many Guide events were held at her home, Casa Loma, in Toronto. It is now a tourist attraction with a special Girl Guide display.

Guiding is now served by the Guiding in Canada - Ontario Council, with 44,000 girl members, 11,000 adults, 13 Areas and 37 camps throughout Ontario.

8th World Scout Jamboree 

In 1955, the 8th World Scout Jamboree was held at Niagara-on-the-Lake, Ontario. This was the first World Jamboree to be held in the Western Hemisphere. The setting was a rolling parkland, and 11,000 Scouts attended this gathering, which was notable for the number of Scout contingents that crossed the Atlantic by air to attend—1,000 from Great Britain alone.

Scout memorials 
Scouting memorials include:

 E.T. Seton Park in Toronto, Ontario name for Ernest Thompson Seton the founding member of the Boy Scouts of America 

 Historic plaque on the Trans Canada Trail at Sir Sandford Fleming College and Outdoor Education Centre in Lindsay, Ontario to mark E.T. Seton's residence in the town from 1866 to 1870.

 Commemorative for the 8th World Scout Jamboree in Niagara-on-the-Lake, Ontario where the 50th Anniversary Plaque and tree planted near Butler's Barracks.

See also 

 Scouts Canada
 Girl Guides of Canada
 World Organization of the Scout Movement (WOSM)
 World Association of Girl Guides and Girl Scouts (WAGGGS)

References

External links
 Greater Toronto Council
 Haliburton
 1st Merrickville Scout Group, Ontario, Canada, claimant to be North America's oldest Scout group
 Thunder Bay Area Council
 Guiding in Canada - Ontario Council
 Voyageur Council Scouting
 ScoutDocs Scout Camp Directory listing
 Scouts Canada on Gays
 Toronto Starts Gay, Lesbian Scouts
 Phelps a No-Show in Toronto
 Loyalist Area

Scouting and Guiding in Canada
Organizations based in Ontario